Dženan Radončić (Cyrillic: Џенан Радончић; born 2 August 1983) is a Montenegrin retired footballer who played as a striker.

Club career
In June 2003, Radončić was transferred from Rudar Pljevlja to Partizan on a four-year contract. He only appeared in four league games, but also managed to make his UEFA Champions League debut in a 1–1 home draw with Marseille, all as a substitute.

However, just half a year upon joining Partizan, Radončić moved to the Far East and joined newly founded K League club Incheon United. He played a major part in United's run to the championship playoff final in 2005. After falling out of favour with caretaker manager Park Lee-chun, Radončić went on loan to J.League side Ventforet Kofu during the 2007 season. He returned to Incheon for 2008, becoming the team's top scorer that season with 13 league goals.

In January 2009, Radončić switched to K League rivals Seongnam Ilhwa Chunma. He was a regular member of the team that won the AFC Champions League in 2010, but missed the final due to accumulated yellow cards.

In December 2011, Radončić signed a three-year deal with fellow K League side Suwon Samsung Bluewings. He moved on loan to J.League club Shimizu S-Pulse in August 2013.

Career statistics

Honours
Seongnam Ilhwa Chunma
 AFC Champions League: 2010
 Korean FA Cup: 2011

References

External links
 
 
 
 

1983 births
Living people
People from Gusinje
Bosniaks of Montenegro
Association football forwards
Serbia and Montenegro footballers
Montenegrin footballers
Montenegrin Muslims
FK Rudar Pljevlja players
FK Partizan players
Incheon United FC players
Ventforet Kofu players
Seongnam FC players
Suwon Samsung Bluewings players
Shimizu S-Pulse players
Omiya Ardija players
Oita Trinita players
FK Mornar players
First League of Serbia and Montenegro players
K League 1 players
J1 League players
J2 League players
Montenegrin First League players
Serbia and Montenegro expatriate footballers
Expatriate footballers in South Korea
Serbia and Montenegro expatriate sportspeople in South Korea
Montenegrin expatriate footballers
Expatriate footballers in Japan
Montenegrin expatriate sportspeople in South Korea
Montenegrin expatriate sportspeople in Japan